Local elections in Serbia were held on 6 May 2012.
Pursuant to the Constitution of Serbia, the parliamentary Speaker (at the time Slavica Đukić Dejanović from SPS) signed on 13 March 2012 the Decision on calling the elections for councilors of municipal assemblies, town assemblies and the Belgrade City Assembly for 6 May 2012, with the exception of: the councilors of the municipal assemblies of Aranđelovac, Bor, Vrbas, Vrnjačka Banja, Knjaževac, Kovin, Kosjerić, Kosovska Mitrovica, Leposavić, Negotin, Novo Brdo, Odžaci, Peć, Prijepolje and Ruma and councilors of the Priština Town Assembly, which have already had extraordinary elections in the period from 2008 to 2012, while for councilors of the municipal assembly of Kula, the elections were already called earlier on 29 February 2012.

Parties were required to cross a five per cent electoral threshold (of all votes, not only of valid votes), although this requirement was waived for parties representing national minority communities.

In line with United Nations SC Resolution 1244, the Government of the Republic of Serbia will, in cooperation with UNMIK, implement all actions necessary for the elections on the territory of the Autonomous Province of Kosovo and Metohija.
 
Some EU member states officials expressed their disagreement over the decisions to call local elections for municipalities in Kosovo and Metohija. Local elections will be observed by a delegation of the Congress of Local and Regional Authorities of the Council of Europe.

Results

Belgrade

City of Belgrade

The U-Turn list did not receive five per cent of the total vote and so fell below the electoral threshold.

Municipalities of Belgrade
Elections were held in fifteen of Belgrade's seventeen constituent municipalities. The exceptions were Voždovac and Zemun, where municipal elections were at the time held on different four-year cycles.

The elections generally were a victory for the Democratic Party, which claimed the mayoralties in nine of the fifteen participating municipalities. The Democratic Party also participated in grand coalition governments with the Progressives and Socialists in two other jurisdictions: Lazarevac (where the mayor was chosen from the ranks of the Socialists) and Rakovica (where the mayor was from the Progressives).

The Progressives also won the mayoralty in Grocka and formed a coalition in Surčin wherein a member of the Socialists was chosen as mayor. The United Regions of Serbia claimed the mayoralty in Obrenovac, and Živorad Milosavljević's independent list won its third consecutive victory in Sopot.

Barajevo
Results of the election for the Municipal Assembly of Barajevo:

Incumbent mayor Branka Savić of the Democratic Party was confirmed for another term in office after the election with the support of seventeen delegates. The government was supported by the Democratic Party, Our Barajevo, two delegates from New Serbia, and one delegate each from the Socialist Party and the Party of United Pensioners of Serbia. The DS later formed a new coalition government in 2013 that included the Progressive Party.

On 16 September 2015, a new local administration was founded by Velibor Novićević of the Progressives in alliance with the Socialists and the Independent Democratic Party of Serbia. Novićević was in turn replaced by fellow Progressive Party member Saša Kostić on 3 December 2015. Kostić had the support of the Democratic Party, the Social Democratic Party, and some other delegates on taking office; he was later expelled from the Progressive Party and joined the Democratic Party of Serbia.

Čukarica
Results of the election for the Municipal Assembly of Čukarica:

Zoran Gajić of the Democratic Party was chosen as mayor after the election; Uroš Janković of the Democratic Party of Serbia served as deputy mayor. In March 2014, a new administration was formed with Srđan Kolarić of the Progressive Party as mayor; he was supported by the Socialist alliance and by the Democratic Party of Serbia.

Grocka
Results of the election for the Municipal Assembly of Grocka:

Dragoljub Simonović of the Progressive Party was chosen as mayor after the election. He was replaced in December 2012 by Zoran Markov; Markov was in turn replaced by Stefan Dilberović in May 2014. Both Markov and Dilberović were also members of the Progressive Party.

Lazarevac
Results of the election for the Municipal Assembly of Lazarevac:

Dragan Alimpijević of the Socialist Party was chosen as mayor after the election. The local government was a grand coalition of the Socialists, the Democratic Party, and the Progressives.

Mladenovac
Results of the election for the Municipal Assembly of Mladenovac:

Dejan Čokić of the Democratic Party was chosen as mayor after the election. Čokić was dismissed from office in 2015, and Vladan Glišić (not to be confused with the future parliamentarian of the same name) led a provisional authority from 2015 to 2016.

New Belgrade
Results of the election for the Municipal Assembly of New Belgrade:

Aleksandar Šapić, at the time a member of the Democratic Party, was chosen as mayor after the election with the support of forty delegates. The municipal government consisted of Choice for a Better New Belgrade, the Liberal Democratic Party, and the alliance around the Socialist Party. 

Parliamentarian Marko Đurišić was elected from the twenty-fourth position on the DS list. He later joined the breakaway Social Democratic Party.

Obrenovac
Results of the election for the Municipal Assembly of Obrenovac:

Miroslav Čučković of the United Regions of Serbia was chosen as mayor after the election.

Palilula
Results of the election for the Municipal Assembly of Palilula:

Stojan Nikolić of the Democratic Party was chosen as mayor after the election. The municipal government consisted of the Democratic Party, the Liberal Democratic Party, and the coalition around the Socialist Party.

Rakovica
Results of the election for the Municipal Assembly of Rakovica:

The Radical Party received less than five per cent of the total vote and so fell below the electoral threshold.

Milosav Miličković of the Progressive Party was chosen as mayor after the election. The municipal government was a grand coalition consisting of the Progressives, the Democratic Party, and the Socialist Party's coalition. Miličković was replaced as mayor by Vladan Kocić in June 2014.

Zoran Krasić was the lead candidate on the Radical Party's list.

Savski Venac
Results of the election for the Municipal Assembly of Savski Venac:

Dušan Dinčić of the Democratic Party was chosen as mayor after the election. His deputy was a member of the Socialist Party. Parliamentarians Nataša Vučković and Nenad Konstantinović were elected on the Democratic Party list.

Sopot
Results of the election for the Municipal Assembly of Sopot:

Incumbent mayor Živorad Milosavljević of the For the Municipality of Sopot list was confirmed for another term in office after the election.

Stari Grad
Results of the election for the Municipal Assembly of Stari Grad:

Dejan Kovačević of the Democratic Party was chosen as mayor after the election. The municipal government included Choice for a Better Stari Grad and the alliance around the Socialist Party. Nemanja Šarović led the Radical Party's list.

Surčin
Results of the election for the Municipal Assembly of Surčin:

Vesna Šalović of the Socialist Party of Serbia was chosen as mayor after the election. The municipal government was formed by the Progressives, the United Regions of Serbia, and the Socialists.

Voždovac
There was no election for the Municipal Assembly of Voždovac in 2012. The previous election had taken place in 2009, and the next election took place in 2013.

Vračar
Results of the election for the Municipal Assembly of Vračar:

Incumbent mayor Branimir Kuzmanović of the Democratic Party was confirmed for a new term in office after the election, receiving the support of thirty-eight delegates. He was replaced by Tijana Blagojević, also of the Democratic Party, on 4 June 2015.

Zemun
There was no election for the Municipal Assembly of Zemun in 2012. The previous election had taken place in 2009, and the next election took place in 2013.

Zvezdara
Results of the election for the Municipal Assembly of Zvezdara:

Edip Šerifov of the Democratic Party was chosen as mayor after the election. The municipal coalition consisted of the Democratic Party, the Liberal Democratic Party, and the coalition around the Socialist Party.

Marija Leković was elected to the assembly from the third position on the Democratic Party list. She took her seat on 11 June 2012 and resigned on the same day upon being re-appointed to the municipal council (i.e., the executive branch of the municipal government). Her term in the latter role was brief; she resigned on 26 June 2012, having been appointed to the Belgrade city council.

Vojvodina

Central Banat District
Local elections were held in the one city (Zrenjanin) and all four municipalities in the Central Banat District. The Progressives won the city election in Zrenjanin and remained in power for the full term. The Democrats finished first in three of the municipalities, with the Liberal Democrats winning the other. There were many changes in government in the latter jurisdictions over the next four years. The Progressives held the mayoralties in two of these communities by the 2016 election, with the League of Social Democrats of Vojvodina holding another; the fourth mayor was an independent who later joined the Progressives.

Zrenjanin
Results of the election for the City Assembly of Zrenjanin:

Goran Knežević of the Progressive Party was chosen as mayor after the election, with the support of the Socialists, as well as of a single delegate from the League of Social Democrats and a delegate from the Serbian Renewal Movement (who had been elected on the League of Social Democrats list). Knežević resigned on 21 August 2012 after being appointed to a cabinet position in the government of Serbia and was replaced by fellow Progressive Party member Ivan Bošnjak. Bošnjak, in turn, resigned on 12 June 2014 after being appointed as a state secretary in the Serbian government; he was replaced by Čedomir Janjić, also of the Progressives.

Nova Crnja
Results of the election for the Municipal Assembly of Nova Crnja:

Incumbent mayor Pera Milankov of the Democratic Party was confirmed for a new term in office after the election. He was arrested in October 2012 on suspicion of giving and accepting bribes and was replaced by Mile Todorov of the Socialist Party, who formed a coalition government with the Progressives and other parties on 20 November 2012. The Socialist-Progressive alliance subsequently broke down, and on 31 May 2013 Todorov was replaced by Danica Stričević of the Progressives, who formed an administration in alliance with the United Regions of Serbia (which had gained members by defections).

After spending a year in custody, Pera Milankov (by this time an independent) was again chosen as mayor on 28 December 2013 at the head of a new governing alliance that included the Democratic Party, the Socialists, and the Alliance of Vojvodina Hungarians. Shortly after the 2016 elections, Milankov joined the Progressive Party.

Novi Bečej
Results of the election for the Municipal Assembly of Novi Bečej:

Saša Šućurović of the Liberal Democratic Party (one of the parties in the Preokret coalition) was chosen as mayor after the election, governing in a coalition with the Democratic Party and League of Social Democrats of Vojvodina. A new coalition government was formed in May 2013, led by the Liberal Democratic Party and the Progressives; Šućurović continued as mayor, and local Progressive Party leader Saša Maksimović became speaker of the assembly.

In September 2015, Šućurović left the Liberal Democrats and joined the League of Social Democrats. Once again, he continued to serve as mayor.

Sečanj
Results of the election for the Municipal Assembly of Sečanj:

Incumbent mayor Predrag Milošević, at the time a member of the Democratic Party, was confirmed for another term in office after the election. He joined the Progressive Party in 2014, taking most of the local Democratic Party organization with him.

Žitište
The results of the election for the Municipal Assembly of Žitište were as follows:

Dušan Milicev of the Socialist Party was chosen as mayor after the election. Milicev was succeeded by Ljubinko Petković of the Democratic Party in June 2013, and Petković was in turn succeeded by Mitar Vučurević of the Progressive Party (which had gained several members by defections) two months later.

North Bačka District
Local elections were held in the one city (Subotica) and both of the municipalities in the North Bačka District. The Democratic Party's coalition won a plurality victory in Subotica and initially claimed the city's mayoralty. The Alliance of Vojvodina Hungarians won the most votes in the other two municipalities and claimed the mayoralty in Baćka Topola, while the Democratic Party took the mayoralty in Mali Iđoš. In 2013, both Democratic Party mayors were replaced; the Alliance of Vojvodina Hungarians took the mayoralty in Subotica, with the Socialist Party taking the office in Mali Iđoš.

Subotica
Results of the election for the City Assembly of Subotica:

Modest Dulić of the Democratic Party was chosen as mayor after the election. The governing majority consisted of the Democratic Party, the Alliance of Vojvodina Hungarians, the Democratic Party of Serbia, the League of Social Democrats, the Liberal Democratic Party, and the Socialist Party. Following a recalibration of the city's political forces, Jenő Maglai of the Alliance of Vojvodina Hungarians became mayor on 21 November 2013. The new parliamentary majority consisted of the Alliance of Vojvodina Hungarians, the Progressives, the Socialists, the Democratic Alliance of Croats in Vojvodina, and some smaller parties and independents.

Bačka Topola
Results of the election for the Municipal Assembly of Bačka Topola:

The local government was formed by the Alliance of Vojvodina Hungarians, the Democratic Party, and the Socialist Party. Melinda Kokai Mernjak of the Alliance of Vojvodina Hungarians was chosen as mayor. She was replaced by her own party in 2014 and replaced by Gabor Kišlinder. By the time of this change, the Socialists had left the government and the Progressives had joined.

Mali Iđoš
Results of the election for the Municipal Assembly of Mali Iđoš:

Eržebet Celuška-Frindik of the Democratic Party was chosen as mayor after the election. She was replaced by Marko Rovčanin of the Socialist Party in 2013.

North Banat District
Local elections were held in all six municipalities of the North Banat District. The Progressive Party's alliance won a narrow victory over the Democratic Party in Kikinda; the Democrats initially formed a local coalition government, but a shift in political alliances the following year saw the Progressives come to power. The Democratic Party won in Ada and Novi Kneževac, and the Alliance of Vojvodina Hungarians won in Čoka, Kanjiža, and Senta.

Kikinda
Results of the election for the Municipal Assembly of Kikinda:

Savo Dobranić of the Democratic Party was chosen as mayor after the election; his deputy was a member of the Socialist Party. Pavle Markov of the Progressive Party succeeded Dobranić in September 2013, after a shift in the municipality's political alliances.

Ada
Results of the election for the Municipal Assembly of Ada:

Incumbent mayor Zoltán Bilicki of the Democratic Party was confirmed for another term in office after the election. He left the party in early 2016.

Čoka
Results of the election for the Municipal Assembly of Čoka:

Ferenc Balaž of the Alliance of Vojvodina Hungarians served as mayor after the election.

Kanjiža
Results of the election for the Municipal Assembly of Kanjiža:

Incumbent mayor Mihály Nyilas of the Alliance of Vojvodina Hungarians was confirmed for another term in office after the election. He was succeeded on 10 July 2014 by fellow party member Mihály Bimbó.

Novi Kneževac
Results of the election for the Municipal Assembly of Novi Kneževac:

Incumbent mayor Dragan Babić of the Democratic Party was confirmed for another term in office after the election.

Senta
Results of the election for the Municipal Assembly of Senta:

Rudolf Czegledi of the Alliance of Vojvodina Hungarians was chosen as mayor after the election.

South Bačka District
Local elections were held in the one city (Novi Sad) and ten of the eleven separate municipalities of the South Bačka District. The exception was Vrbas, which was on a different four-year electoral cycle at the time.

The City of Novi Sad comprises two municipalities (the City municipality of Novi Sad and Petrovaradin), although their powers are very limited relative to the city government. Unlike Belgrade, Niš, and Vranje, Novi Sad does not have directly elected municipal assemblies.

Most of the local elections in South Bačka did not produce clear winners. The Democratic Party's lists technically won plurality victories in eight of the eleven jurisdictions that held elections, but they were only able to claim the mayoralties in Novi Sad (temporarily) and five other municipalities (including two where the party actually lost the popular vote). Progressive Party candidates won the mayoralties in three other municipalities, and candidates of the Socialist Party were chosen as mayor in Bačka Palanka and Srbobran.

Novi Sad
Results of the election for the City Assembly of Novi Sad:

Incumbent mayor Igor Pavličić of the Democratic Party was confirmed for another term in office after the election. He lost his majority later in the year, and Miloš Vučević of the Serbian Progressive Party became mayor on 14 September 2012. The local coalition government (after Vučević became mayor) consisted of the Progressives, the Democratic Party of Serbia, Dveri, the Roma Democratic Party, the Serbian Renewal Movement, and the Socialist Party of Serbia. Milorad Mirčić, who served as the city's mayor in the 1990s, was re-elected to the assembly on the Radical Party list.

Bač
Results of the election for the Municipal Assembly of Bač:

Mirko Pušara of the Progressive Party was chosen as mayor after the election. The government was formed by the Progressives and the Socialists; an individual delegate from the LSV and a delegate from the Radical Party also voted to approve the government. In December 2012, a new administration was formed by the Democratic Party in alliance with the League of Social Democrats of Vojvodina and the Radical Party. Ognjen Marković of the Democratic Party was chosen as mayor; Pušara initially refused to stand down, claiming the change in government was illegal.

Another change in administration took place in April 2014, with the Progressives returning to office in alliance with the Socialists and the League of Social Democrats. Dragan Stašević of the Progressive Party was chosen as mayor.

Bačka Palanka
Results of the election for the Municipal Assembly of Bačka Palanka:

Bojan Radman of the Socialist Party was chosen as mayor after the election. Aleksandar Đedovac of the Progressive Party was chosen as deputy mayor. In 2013, Radman and Đedovac rotated positions. The local governing coalition consisted of delegates of the Progressives, the Socialists, the Democratic Party of Serbia, Dveri, and the Alliance of Vojvodina Hungarians.

Bački Petrovac
Results of the election for the Municipal Assembly of Bački Petrovac:

Pavel Marčok of the Democratic Party was chosen as mayor after the election.

Bečej
Results of the election for the Municipal Assembly of Bečej:

Vuk Radojević of the Progressive Party was chosen as mayor after the election.

Beočin
Results of the election for the Municipal Assembly of Beočin:

Incumbent mayor Bogdan Cvejić of the Democratic Party was confirmed for another term in office after the election.

Srbobran
Results of the election for the Municipal Assembly of Srbobran:

Zoran Mladenović of the Socialist Party was chosen as mayor after the election. The local governing coalition consisted of the Socialists, the Movement for Change list, and the LSV.

Sremski Karlovci
Results of the election for the Municipal Assembly of Sremski Karlovci:

Incumbent mayor Milenko Filipović of the Democratic Party was confirmed for another term in office after the election. The governing coalition consisted of the Democratic Party, the Socialist Party, and the League of Social Democrats of Vojvodina. The United Regions of Serbia later joined the government, and the Progressive Party joined in October 2013.

Temerin
Results of the election for the Municipal Assembly of Temerin:

The municipal government of Temerin changed several times between 2012 and 2016.

Vladislav Capik of the Democratic Party was chosen as mayor after the election. The government consisted of the Democratic Party, the Socialist Party and United Pensioners, the Democratic Party of Vojvodina Hungarians, the Democratic Party of Serbia–New Serbia alliance, the Alliance of Vojvodina Hungarians, and the "For the Prosperity of the Municipality of Temerin" group.

On 12 March 2014, a new administration was formed with Gustonj Andraš of the Democratic Party of Vojvodina Hungarians as mayor. The new administration included the Democratic Party of Vojvodina Hungarians, the Socialist Party and United Pensioners, the Democratic Party of Serbia–New Serbia alliance, the Liberal Democratic Party, and the Democratic Party. The Radicals were not part of the governing coalition but provided support on a motion of confidence.

Following another political realignment, Đuro Žiga of the Progressive Party became mayor in October 2014. The new governing coalition included the Progressives and Socialist Movement, the Socialist Party and United Pensioners, the Serbian Renewal Movement, and two groups of independent representatives.

Future parliamentarian Rozália Ökrész was elected as the lead candidate on the Alliance of Vojvodina Hungarians list.

Titel
Results of the election for the Municipal Assembly of Titel:

Dragan Božić of the Progressive Party was chosen as mayor following the election. In 2014, the Democratic Party formed a new assembly majority with the United Regions of Serbia and the Socialist Party (also supported by individual members of other parties), and Milan Nastasić became the municipality's new mayor. Božić returned to office in December 2014 via an alliance of the Progressives and Radicals, also supported by the Socialists.

Vrbas
There was no election for the Municipal Assembly of Vrbas in 2012. The previous election had taken place in 2009, and the next election took place in 2013.

Žabalj
Results of the election for the Municipal Assembly of Žabalj:

Čedomir Božić of the Democratic Party was chosen as mayor after the election. The Democrats originally governed in an alliance that included the Socialist Party of Serbia.

South Banat District
Local elections were held in the two cities (Pančevo and Vršac) and five of the six other municipalities of the South Banat District. The exception was Kovin, where the previous election had been held in 2009 and the next election was held in 2013. 

The Democratic Party won a narrow victory in Pančevo but fell well short of a majority and ultimately served in opposition. The Serbian Progressive Party and the Socialist Party of Serbia formed a coalition government, and a representative of the Socialists was initially chosen as mayor. The Democratic Party won and formed government in four of the other six jurisdictions that held elections. Independent lists won and formed government in Vršac and Opovo; in the latter case, the list was aligned with the Democratic Party. 

By the time of the 2016 elections, the Progressive Party had come to power in all jurisdictions in South Banat except for Plandište.

Pančevo
Results of the election for the City Assembly of Pančevo:

Svetozar Gavrilović of the Socialist Party of Serbia was chosen as mayor after the election, leading a government that included the Progressive and Socialist alliances, the Democratic Party of Serbia, and the United Regions of Serbia. He resigned in May 2013, citing health issues, and was replaced by Pavle Radanov of the Serbian Progressive Party. Radanov in turn resigned in June 2015 and was replaced by Saša Pavlov, who had been elected on the list of the United Regions of Serbia but was by this time a member of the Progressive Party.

Marinika Tepić was elected to the city assembly from the lead position on the League of Social Democrats of Vojvodina list. She resigned on 16 July 2012 after being appointed to the provincial executive.

Alibunar
Results of the election for the Municipal Assembly of Alibunar:

Incumbent mayor Dušan Jovanović of the Democratic Party was chosen as mayor after the election. He was replaced by Đurica Gligorijev of the same party in June 2014. The Serbian Progressive Party and the Socialist Party of Serbia took over the local government in June 2015, and Predrag Belić of the Progressives was chosen as mayor.

Bela Crkva
Results of the election for the Municipal Assembly of Bela Crkva:

Stanko Petrović of the Democratic Party was chosen as mayor after the election. He was succeeded by Darko Bogosavljević of the Serbian Progressive Party following a change in government in January 2016.

Kovačica
Results of the election for the Municipal Assembly of Kovačica:

Incumbent mayor Miroslav Krišan of the Democratic Party was confirmed for another term in office after the election. There was a change in government in October 2015, and he was succeeded by Jan Husarik of the Serbian Progressive Party.

Kovin
There was no municipal election in Kovin in 2012. The previous election had taken place in 2009, and the next election took place in 2013.

Opovo
Results of the election for the Municipal Assembly of Opovo:

Former mayor Milorad Soldatović, an independent aligned with the Democratic Party and the Social Democratic Party of Serbia, was confirmed for another term in office after the election. He resigned in September 2015 and was replaced by Miloš Markov of the Serbian Progressive Party.

Plandište
Results of the election for the Municipal Assembly of Plandište:

Milan Selaković of the Democratic Party was chosen as mayor after the election.

Vršac
Results of the election for the City Assembly of Vršac:

Incumbent mayor Čedomir Živković of Movement of the Vršac Region–European Region was confirmed for another term in office after the election. In 2015, he joined the Serbian Progressive Party.

West Bačka District
Local elections were held in the one city (Sombor) and two of the other three municipalities in the West Bačka District. The exception was Odžaci, where the most recent local election had taken place in 2010. The Democratic Party won plurality victories in Sombor and Kula and initially formed government in both jurisdictions; by 2014, however, shifting political alliances had brought the Serbian Progressive Party to power in both areas. In Apatin, longtime Socialist Party mayor Živorad Smiljanić led his party to another victory.

Sombor
Results of the election for the City Assembly of Sombor:

Incumbent mayor Nemanja Delić of the Democratic Party was confirmed for another term in office after the election. He was removed from office in April 2014 amid shifting political alliances in the city and was replaced by Saša Todorović of the Progressive Party.

Parliamentarian Žika Gojković was elected to the city assembly from the first position on the SPO list. He resigned his seat on 16 February 2013.

Apatin
Results of the election for the Municipal Assembly of Apatin:

Incumbent mayor Živorad Smiljanić of the Socialist Party was confirmed for another term in office after the election. He resigned in October 2013 following a conflict-of-interest warning but was re-elected as mayor on the same day.

Kula
Results of the election for the Municipal Assembly of Kula:

Lazar Greber of the Democratic Party was chosen as mayor after the election. Following a change in government in October 2012, Greber was replaced by Dragan Trifunović of the Progressive Party.

Odžaci
There was no election for the Municipal Assembly of Odžaci in 2012. The previous election had taken place in 2010 and the next election took place in 2013.

Šumadija and Western Serbia

Moravica District
Local elections were held in the one city (Čačak) and all three other municipalities of the Moravica District. New Serbia won an extremely narrow victory in its historical stronghold of Čačak and continued to lead a coalition government afterward. The Socialists remained in power in Gornji Milanovac, an independent list formed government in Ivanjica, and the Democratic Party led a government in Lučani (despite having finished second).

Čačak
Results of the election for the City Assembly of Čačak:

Vojislav Ilić, the brother of New Serbia leader Velimir Ilić (and himself a member of the same party), was chosen as mayor after the election. Future parliamentarian Biljana Rubaković was elected from the sixth position on the Dveri list.

Gornji Milanovac
Results of the election for the Municipal Assembly of Gornji Milanovac:

Incumbent mayor Milisav Mirković of the Socialist Party was confirmed for another term in office after the election.

Ivanjica
Results of the election for the Municipal Assembly of Ivanjica:

Independent candidate Milomir Zorić was chosen as mayor after the election, in a coalition with the Progressives, the Democratic Party of Serbia, the Party of United Pensioners of Serbia, and the Serbian Renewal Movement. The Progressives left the coalition in December 2013, leading to a period of a political stalemate. In October 2014, Zorić formed a new coalition with the Socialists.

Lučani
Results of the election for the Municipal Assembly of Lučani:

Mladomir Sretenović of the Democratic Party was chosen as mayor after the election. The Movement for the Development of Dragačevo list boycotted the inaugural session of the assembly. When the Democratic Party split in early 2014, Sretenović sided with Boris Tadić's breakaway New Democratic Party (later renamed as the Social Democratic Party). The local government was dissolved and new elections were held in 2014.

Pomoravlje District
Local elections were held in the one city (Jagodina) and all five other municipalities of the Pomoravlje District. United Serbia won a majority victory in its home base of Jagodina in an alliance with the Socialist Party of Serbia. The Democratic Party won the elections and formed government in Despotovac, Paraćin, and Svilajnac, although by the end of the term it only remained in power in Paraćin. The Serbian Progressive Party and the Socialists formed a new government in Despotovac in 2013, and the Democratic Party in Svilajnac later formed his own political movement.

The Progressives won the election in Ćuprija and, after an initial period of instability, formed government in the community. A member of the Socialist Party became the mayor in Rekovac following an inconclusive election in that municipality.

Jagodina
Results of the election for the City Assembly of Jagodina:

Ratko Stevanović of United Serbia was chosen as mayor after the election.

Ćuprija
Results of the election for the Municipal Assembly of Ćuprija:

The election did not produce a clear winner. Slobodan Lazić of the Socialist Party of Serbia was initially chosen as mayor. He resigned in December 2012 after being advised he was in a conflict-of-interest situation. His replacement was Radosav Đorđević, the leader of the Ravanica list.

In June 2013, the Serbian Progressive Party and the Democratic Party formed a new administration. Ninoslav Erić, who by this time had joined the Progressives, was chosen as mayor.

Despotovac
Results of the election for the Municipal Assembly of Despotovac:

Incumbent mayor Mališa Alimpijević of the Democratic Party was chosen as mayor after the election. In January 2013, the Serbian Progressive Party and the Socialist Party of Serbia formed a new administration with Dejan Nenadović of the Socialists in the role of mayor.

Paraćin
Results of the election for the Municipal Assembly of Paraćin:

Incumbent mayor Saśa Paunović of the Democratic Party was confirmed for another term in office after the election.

Rekovac
Results of the election for the Municipal Assembly of Rekovac:

Predrag Đorđević of the Socialist Party of Serbia was chosen as mayor after the election.

Svilajnac
Results of the election for the Municipal Assembly of Svilajnac:

Predrag Milanović of the Democratic Party was chosen as mayor after the election. Following a split in the party, he joined the Social Democratic Party under Boris Tadić's leadership. He later created his own local party called Svilajnac Protects the Future.

Gorica Gajić was elected from the lead position on the Democratic Party of Serbia list.

Rasina District
Local elections were held in the one city (Kruševac) and all five other municipalities of the Rasina District. Despite losing the popular vote, the Serbian Progressive Party and its allies were able to form a stable coalition government in Kruševac. The Serbian Renewal Movement likewise lost the popular vote in Varvarin but was able to remain in government under incumbent mayor Zoran Milenković.

The United Regions of Serbia formed government in Trstenik with Miroslav Aleksić as mayor; he continued in office after becoming leader of the People's Movement of Serbia in 2015. Zlatan Krkić of the Democratic Party was returned to office in Ćićevac and, similarly, remained in office after withdrawing from the party and creating his own political movement in 2015.

Milutin Jeličić led New Serbia to a plurality victory in Brus, but could not initially form a new administration; a coalition of the Progressives and the Socialist Party of Serbia governed for the next three years. In 2015, local divisions in the ranks of the Progressive Party brought Jeličić back to power. Jugoslav Stajkovac's independent list won the election in Aleksandrovac, but he too was not initially able to form a new administration. He briefly returned to the mayor's office in August 2012 and returned again leading a more stable administration in August 2013.

Kruševac
Results of the election for the City Assembly of Kruševac:

Bratislav Gašić of the Serbian Progressive Party was chosen as mayor after the election. He resigned in April 2014 after being appointed as Serbia's minister of defence and was replaced by Dragi Nestorović, also of the Progressive Party.

Aleksandrovac
Results of the election for the Municipal Assembly of Aleksandrovac:

There were several changes in the composition of the municipal government of Aleksandrovac after the 2012 election.

Following difficult negotiations, a coalition government was established in June 2012 consisting of the For a Rich Parish group, the Democratic Party, the Socialist Party of Serbia–United Serbia group, and the Serbian Progressive Party, with outside support from the United Regions of Serbia. Zoran Bojović of the Progressives was chosen as mayor.

Former mayor Jugoslav Stajkovac's Movement for the Parish group formed a new alliance with the Socialist Party in August 2012, and Stajkovac was returned to the mayor's office in September. His administration fell within days, and a new coalition was established later in the same month by the Progressives, the Socialists, the United Regions of Serbia, the For a Rich Parish group, and the Democratic Party. Dragan Blagojević of the Progressives was chosen as mayor.

In March 2013, Stajkovac's group merged into the United Regions of Serbia and established a new assembly majority with the Progressives, the Socialists, and For a Rich Parish. Blagojević continued as mayor. This arrangement lasted until August 2013, when Stajkovac once again returned to the mayor's office, leading a new coalition of the URS, the Democratic Party and two former Progressive delegates. He later left the URS, which ceased to exist in 2015, and relaunched the Movement for the Parish group.

Brus
Results of the election for the Municipal Assembly of Brus:

A coalition government was formed after the election by the Serbian Progressive Party, the Socialist Party of Serbia, the United Regions of Serbia, the Democratic Party of Serbia, and the Transformation group. Zoran Obradović of the Socialist Party was chosen as mayor. He was removed from office in August 2013 and Slobodan Vidojević of the Progressive Party was chosen in his place.

In 2015, divisions in the ranks of the local Progressive organization allowed former mayor Milutin Jeličić of New Serbia to return to office in an alliance with the Democratic Party.

Ćićevac
Results of the election for the Municipal Assembly of Ćićevac:

Incumbent mayor Zlatan Krkić of the Democratic Party was confirmed for another term in office after the election. Following a split in the Democratic Party in 2014, he joined the breakaway Social Democratic Party. In the autumn of 2015, he formed a local political organization called the Movement for the Preservation of the Municipality of Ćićevac.

Trstenik
Results of the election for the Municipal Assembly of Trstenik:

Miroslav Aleksić of the United Regions of Serbia was chosen as mayor after the election, leading a coalition government that also included the Serbian Progressive Party, New Serbia, the Socialist Party of Serbia, and the Party of United Pensioners of Serbia. He left the United Regions of Serbia in 2014, and in February 2015 he became the leader of the newly formed People's Movement of Serbia.

Varvarin
Results of the election for the Municipal Assembly of Varvarin:

Incumbent mayor Zoran Milenković of the Serbian Renewal Movement was confirmed for a new term in office after the election, leading a coalition that included the Serbian Progressive Party, the Democratic Party of Serbia, and the United Regions of Serbia. He served for the entirety of the term.

Raška District
Local elections were held in the two cities (Kraljevo and Novi Pazar) and the three other municipalities of the Raška District. The Serbian Progressive Party and its allies won and formed government in the predominantly Serb municipalities of Kraljevo and Vrnjačka Banja. The Socialist Party of Serbia won in the predominantly Serb municipality of Raška; in 2014, however, a member of the Progressives became the municipality's mayor. The Sandžak Democratic Party won in the predominantly Bosniak city of Novi Pazar, while the Party of Democratic Action of Sandžak won in Tutin, also a predominantly Bosniak community.

Kraljevo
Results of the election for the City Assembly of Kraljevo:

Dragan Jovanović of the Serbian Progressive Party was chosen mayor after the election, leading an alliance that also included the Socialist Party of Serbia. He resigned in 2014 and was replaced by Tomislav Ilić of New Serbia, one of the parties in the broader alliance around the Progressives. In January 2016, Ilić joined the Progressives.

Novi Pazar
Results of the election for the City Assembly of Novi Pazar:

Incumbent mayor Meho Mahmutović of the Sandžak Democratic Party was confirmed for a new term in office after the election.

Amela Lukač Zoranić was elected from the third position on the All Together–Bosniak Democratic Union list.

Raška
Results of the election for the City Assembly of Raška:

Jovan Čorbić of the Socialist Party of Serbia was chosen as mayor after the election. He was replaced by Ignjat Rakitić of the Serbian Progressive Party in June 2014.

Tutin
Results of the election for the Municipal Assembly of Tutin:

Šemsudin Kučević of the Party of Democratic Action of Sandžak, who had previously served as mayor from 1996 to 2008, was chosen for another term in office following the election.

Incumbent mayor Bajro Gegić was elected from the second position on the Party of Democratic Action of Sandžak list. Future parliamentarian Zaim Redžepović was elected from the second position on the Bosniak Democratic Union list.

Vrnjačka Banja
Results of the election for the Municipal Assembly of Vrnjačka Banja:

Boban Đurović of the Serbian Progressive Party was chosen as mayor in August 2012, leading a coalition administration that also included the Socialist Party of Serbia, the United Regions of Serbia, United Serbia, and the Democratic Party of Serbia.

Šumadija District
Local elections were held in the one city (Kragujevac) and five of the six other municipalities of the Šumadija District. The exception was Aranđelovac, where the last election had been held in 2010.

Together for Šumadija leader Veroljub Stevanović affiliated with the United Regions of Serbia in this election and won a plurality victory in Kragujevac. He remained in office for two years before a shift in local political alliances brought the Serbian Progressive Party to power.

The Democratic Party won a majority in Batočina and held power in that municipality for the term that followed. It also won a plurality victory in Lapovo and, while it narrowly lost the election to the Socialist Party of Serbia, also formed government in Knić; in both of these jurisdictions, the government proved unstable and the party fell from power.

An independent list aligned with United Regions of Serbia won in Rača, while incumbent mayor Dragan Jovanović led a coalition led by New Serbia to a majority victory in Topola.

Kragujevac
Results of the election for the City Assembly of Kragujevac:

Incumbent mayor Veroljub Stevanović of Together for Šumadija was confirmed for another term in office after the election, with support from the Liberal Democratic Party, the Serbian Renewal Movement, the Socialist Party of Serbia, United Serbia, the Democratic Party of Serbia, and smaller parties represented in the assembly. Over the next two years, Stevanović's allies left the government; when the Serbian Renewal Movement switched its affiliation in October 2014, the Serbian Progressive Party was able to form a new city administration with Radomir Nikolić as mayor.

Aranđelovac
There was no election for the Municipal Assembly of Aranđelovac in 2012. The previous election had taken place in 2010, and the next took place in 2014.

Batočina
Results of the election for the Municipal Assembly of Batočina:

Incumbent mayor Radiša Milošević of the Democratic Party was confirmed for another term in office after the election.

Knić
Results of the election for the Municipal Assembly of Knić:

Incumbent mayor Borislav Busarac of the Democratic Party was confirmed for another term in office after the election. He was removed from office on 30 May 2013 and was replaced by Dragana Jovanović of the Socialist Party. Jovanović was in turn removed in February 2014, and Ljubomir Đurđević of United Serbia was chosen as mayor the following month in a new alliance that included the Democratic Party.

Lapovo
Results of the election for the Municipal Assembly of Lapovo:

Nebojša Miletić of the Democratic Party was chosen as mayor after the election. He was replaced in June 2014 by Jasna Jovanović of the "For the Life of Lapovo" list. Jovanović was in turn replaced by Nebojša Tasić of the Progressive Party in June 2015.

Rača
Results of the election for the Municipal Assembly of Rača:

Incumbent mayor Dragana Živanović of United Regions was confirmed for another term in office after the election. She was replaced in February 2015 by Dragan Stevanović of the Progressive Party.

Topola
Results of the election for the Municipal Assembly of Topola:

Incumbent mayor Dragan Jovanović of New Serbia was confirmed for another term in office after the election. He resigned in August 2014 after being elected to the national assembly, as he could not hold a dual mandate as a parliamentarian and a member of the local executive. Jovanović instead became president (i.e., speaker) of the local assembly and was replaced as mayor by Dragan Živanović, also of New Serbia.

Zlatibor District
Local elections were held in the one city (i.e., Užice) and eight of the nine municipalities of the Zlatibor District. The exception was Kosjerić, where the previous local election had taken place in 2009.

The Democratic Party won in Užice and also in Požega, and initially led a coalition government in both jurisdictions. In both cases, the party lost power to the Serbian Progressive Party in the term that followed.

The Progressives won in Arilje and Nova Varoš and formed government in both municipalities (although they briefly lost power in the former community in 2015). In Priboj, the Progressives led a grand coalition government that also included several other parties. The Serbian Radical Party won a rare victory in Bajina Bašta and led a local coalition government until 2014, at which time the Progressives became the dominant power in the local administration.

Incumbent mayor Milan Stamatović led the Democratic Party of Serbia to a majority victory in Čajetina. The Sandžak Democratic Party won the election in Prijepolje and led a coalition government afterward, while the Party of Democratic Action of Sandžak did the same in Sjenica.

Užice
Results of the election for the City Assembly of Užice:

The Dveri list did not receive five per cent of the total votes cast and so fell below the electoral threshold.

Incumbent mayor Jovan Marković of the Democratic Party was initially confirmed for another term in office after the election. The city's political alliances subsequently changed, and in October 2012 Marković was succeeded by Saša Milošević of the Serbian Progressive Party Milošević in turn resigned in August 2014 and was replaced by Tihomir Petković, who had been elected on the list of the Democratic Party of Serbia but later joined the Progressive Party.

Arilje
Results of the election for the Municipal Assembly of Arilje:

Zoran Todorović of the Serbian Progressive Party was chosen as mayor after the election.

In June 2015, a coalition of the Serbian Radical Party, the Movement of Workers and Peasants, and Dveri came to power with outside support from the Democratic Party and the Liberal Democratic Party. Milan Nikolić of the Radicals was chosen as mayor. The Progressives returned to power in December 2015, and Todorović was returned to the mayor's office.

Bajina Bašta
Results of the election for the Municipal Assembly of Bajina Bašta:

Incumbent mayor Zlatan Jovanović of the Serbian Radical Party was confirmed for another term in office after the election, leading a somewhat unusual coalition government with the Democratic Party and the Democratic Party of Serbia. The Democratic Party subsequently left the government and was replaced by the Serbian Progressive Party.

Jovanović stood down as mayor in early 2014 and was succeeded by Radomir Filipović of the Progressive Party.

Čajetina
Results of the election for the Municipal Assembly of Čajetina:

Incumbent mayor Milan Stamatović of the Democratic Party of Serbia was confirmed for another term in office after the election. He left that party in 2014 and was a co-founder of the Serbian People's Party in the same year.

Bojana Božanić of the Democratic Party of Serbia was elected to the assembly from the third position on the DSS's list. She resigned shortly thereafter to serve a second term as an assistant to Stamatović.

Kosjerić
There was no municipal election in Kosjerić in 2012. The previous election had taken place in 2009, and the next election took place in 2013.

Nova Varoš
Results of the election for the Municipal Assembly of Nova Varoš:

Dimitrije Paunović of the Serbian Progressive Party was chosen as mayor after the election. He resigned on 6 January 2016 after being appointed as commissioner of the Zlatibor District. Ivan Mladenović subsequently oversaw an interim administration pending new elections.

Požega
Results of the election for the Municipal Assembly of Požega:

Incumbent mayor Milovan Mićović of the Democratic Party was confirmed for another term in office after the election. The government changed in October 2015, and Milan Božić of the Serbian Progressive Party became mayor.

Priboj
Results of the election for the Municipal Assembly of Priboj:

Incumbent mayor Lazar Rvović of the Serbian Progressive Party was confirmed for another term in office after the election, leading a grand coalition government that also included the Democratic Party, the Serbian Renewal Movement, the Sandžak Democratic Party, the Socialist Party of Serbia, and New Serbia.

Future parliamentarian Dijana Radović appeared in the sixth position on the Socialist list; she was not immediately election but received a mandate on 19 July 2012 as the replacement for another party member.

Prijepolje
Results of the election for the Municipal Assembly of Prijepolje:

Emir Hašimbegović of the Sandžak Democratic Party was chosen as mayor after the election.

Sjenica
Results of the election for the Municipal Assembly of Sjenica:

Hazbo Mujović of the Party of Democratic Action of Sandžak was chosen as mayor after the election.

Southern and Eastern Serbia

Jablanica District

Leskovac

Nišava District
Local elections were held for the City Assembly of Niš, the assemblies in all five of Niš's constituent municipalities, and the assemblies in all six of the Nišava District's other municipalities.

The Progressive Party formed coalition governments with the Socialist Party and the United Regions of Serbia shortly after the election in the City of Niš, four of the city's five municipalities (the exception being Niška Banja), and Aleksinac. The Progressive Party's alliance won the popular vote in all of these jurisdictions except for Medijana, where the Democratic Party placed first.

The situation was different in the district's smaller municipalities. Local incumbent mayors led the Socialist Party to victory in Gadžin Han, New Serbia to victory in Ražanj, the United Regions of Serbia to victory to Doljevac, and the United Peasant Party to victory in Svrljig. The Socialists also won the popular vote in Merošina and initially formed a coalition government with the Democratic Party and the United Regions of Serbia. This alliance fell apart in December 2012, and a new coalition of the Progressive Party and the United Regions of Serbia came to power. The local Progressive organization subsequently became divided, leading to instability in the local government.

In Niška Banja, the Democratic Party of Serbia won the popular vote and formed a coalition government afterwards; the incumbent mayor later left the Democratic Party of Serbia for the United Regions of Serbia, and, after that party's dissolution, joined the Serbian People's Party.

Niš
Results of the election for the City Assembly of Niš:

Zoran Perišić of the Progressive Party was chosen as mayor after the election. The city government was initially formed by the Progressives, the Socialists, and the United Regions of Serbia.

Crveni Krst
Results of the election for the Municipal Assembly of Crveni Krst:

Darko Bulatović of the Progressive Party was chosen as mayor after the election, with the votes of nineteen delegates. The local government was formed by the Progressives, the United Regions of Serbia, and the Socialists. Bulatović resigned as mayor in May 2014 and was replaced by Miroslav Milutinović, a former Socialist who crossed over to the Progressives.

Medijana
Results of the election for the Municipal Assembly of Medijana:

Nebojša Krstić of the United Regions of Serbia was chosen as mayor after the election, with the support of sixteen delegates. The government consisted of the Progressives, the Socialists, the United Regions of Serbia, and the Democratic Party of Serbia. Krstić was replaced as mayor by Zoran Stojanović of the Progressive Party in August 2014.

Niška Banja
Results of the election for the Municipal Assembly of Niška Banja:

Incumbent mayor Zoran Vidanović of the Democratic Party of Serbia was confirmed for another term in office after the election. The government initially consisted of the Democratic Party of Serbia, the Socialists, and the Reformist Party. Vidanović left the Democratic Party of Serbia in September 2012 and joined the United Regions of Serbia. That party dissolved in 2015, at which time Vidanović joined the Serbian People's Party.

Palilula, Niš
Results of the election for the Municipal Assembly of Palilula, Niš:

Boban Džunić of the Progressive Party was chosen as mayor after the election. The government consisted of the Progressives, the Socialists, and the United Regions of Serbia, with outside support from the Democratic Party of Serbia.

Pantelej
Results of the election for the Municipal Assembly of Pantelej:

Srđan Savić of the Socialist Party was chosen as mayor after the election. The government consisted of the Progressives, the United Regions of Serbia, and the Socialists.

Aleksinac
Results of the election for the Municipal Assembly of Aleksinac:

Incumbent mayor Ivan Dimić of the Democratic Party of Serbia was initially confirmed for a new term in office after the election in June 2012, leading a coalition government that also included the Democratic Party, the Party of United Pensioners of Serbia, and United Serbia. This coalition quickly broke down, however, and a new administration consisting of the Progressives, the United Regions of Serbia, the Socialists, and United Serbia came to power the following month, with Nenad Stanković of the Progressives in the role of mayor.

Doljevac
Results of the election for the Municipal Assembly of Doljevac:

Incumbent mayor Goran Ljubić of the United Regions of Serbia was confirmed for another term in office after the election. The United Regions party dissolved in late 2015, and Ljubić joined the Progressives in February 2016, bringing the entire United Regions assembly group with him.

Gadžin Han
Results of the election for the Municipal Assembly of Gadžin Han:

Incumbent mayor Saša Đorđević of the Socialist Party was confirmed for another term in office after the election.

Merošina
Results of the election for the Municipal Assembly of Merošina:

Incumbent mayor Slobodan Todorović of the Socialist Party was initially confirmed for another term in office, leading a coalition government that also included the Democratic Party and the United Regions of Serbia. In December 2012, the United Regions of Serbia formed a new governing coalition with the Progressives, aided by two former Socialist delegates. Sanja Stajić, at the time a member of the United Regions of Serbia, was chosen as mayor. Stajić was in turn dismissed in November 2013 and replaced by Bojan Nešić of the Progressive Party.

In April 2016, the local Progressive organization attempted to replace Nešić. This led to a split in the party's assembly delegation, with Nešić forming a breakaway group called "Naprednjaci Merošine" and establishing a new coalition with the Democratic Party.

Ražanj
Results of the election for the Municipal Assembly of Ražanj:

Incumbent mayor Dobrica Stojković of New Serbia was confirmed for another term in office after the election.

Svrljig
Results of the election for the Municipal Assembly of Svrljig:

Incumbent mayor Milija Miletić of the United Peasant Party was confirmed for another term in office after the election. The local government also included the United Regions of Serbia. Miletić resigned in April 2014 after being elected to the National Assembly of Serbia and was replaced by fellow party member Jelena Trifunović.

Podunavlje District
Local elections were held in the one city (Smederevo) and the two other municipalities of the Podunavlje District. An independent list won in Smederevo; the following year, the list's delegates collectively joined the Serbian Progressive Party. The Democratic Party won in Smederevska Palanka and held power for the entire term, while the Democratic Party of Serbia won in Velika Plana but fell from power in 2015, when a new coalition dominated by the Progressives came to power.

Smederevo
Results of the election for the City Assembly of Smederevo:

Jasna Avramović of the Movement for Smederevo was chosen as mayor after the election.  In June 2013, Avramović and the entire Movement for Smederevo assembly group joined the Serbian Progressive Party.

Smederevska Palanka
Results of the election for the Municipal Assembly of Smederevska Palanka:

Radoslav Milojičić of the Democratic Party was chosen as mayor after the election. Although the government was initially unstable, Milojičić remained in office for the entire term.

Velika Plana
Results of the election for the Municipal Assembly of Velika Plana:

Incumbent mayor Dejan Šulkić of the Democratic Party of Serbia was confirmed for another term in office after the election. His term ended on 25 August 2015, when the local Democratic Party board formed a new coalition with the Serbian Progressive Party (against the wishes of the Democratic Party at the republic level). Igor Matković of the Progressives was chosen as mayor following this change.

References 

Local elections in Serbia
Loc
May 2012 events in Europe